The 1992 Syracuse Orangemen football team represented Syracuse University in the 1992 NCAA Division I-A football season. The Orangemen were led by second-year head coach Paul Pasqualoni and played their home games at the Carrier Dome in Syracuse, New York. Syracuse finished the season 10–2 with a victory in the 1993 Fiesta Bowl over Colorado. Ranked 6th in the final AP Poll, the team was awarded the Lambert-Meadowlands Trophy, signifying them as champions of the East. As of 2020, this is the last time the Orangemen won the award, and also the school's last top-10 ranked finish.

Schedule

Source:

Roster

References

Syracuse
Syracuse Orange football seasons
Lambert-Meadowlands Trophy seasons
Fiesta Bowl champion seasons
Syracuse Orangemen football